The Kneeling Nun Tuff is a geologic formation exposed in southwest New Mexico. It has a radiometric age of 35.3 million years, corresponding to the latest Eocene epoch.

It has been studied by geologists seeking to understand the processes whereby supereruptions are triggered.

Description
At the type location, the tuff has pronounced columnar jointing and faint horizontal sheeting. The overall composition of the tuff is largely rhyolitic, but with some quartz latite beds.

The formation was erupted from the Emory caldera of the Mogollon-Datil volcanic field. The Kneeling Nun Tuff overlies the Sugarlump Tuff, whose eruption vents have not been confidently identified, and the Rubio Peak Formation. It is possible that the low-volume Sugarlump Tuff represents early leakage from the same magma chamber as the Kneeling Nun Tuff. The Kneeling Nun Tuff interfingers with the Bell Top Formation, forming the #5 tuff bed within the Bell Top.

The Kneeling Nun Tuff has a radiometric age of 35.299 ± 0.039 million years. Over  of tuff was emplaced by the supereruption, which emptied a magma chamber in the upper crust that had formed over a time period of more than a million years. During most of this period, the magma chamber was filled with a crystal mush, consisting of over 50% solid crystals suspended in liquid magma, but during the 50,000 years immediately preceding the eruption, this magma was mobilized by increased recharge of the magma chamber that reduced the crystal fraction to under 50%.

The eruption of the Emory caldera was followed by formation of a resurgent dome as the caldera floor was pushed back upwards by fresh injections of magma. Thick beds of densely welded intracaldera Kneeling Nun Tuff are exposed in the heavy faulted resurgent dome, which forms the core of the Black Range.

History of investigation
The unit was first defined by H.L. Jicha, Jr., in 1954 for exposures in the Santa Rita, New Mexico area. These include the Kneeling Nun, a prominent natural rock feature overlooking the town, for which the unit was named. The unit was assigned to the Datil Group by Ratte and coinvestigators in 1991.

References 

Paleogene formations of New Mexico
Eocene volcanism
Tuff formations